The C-class submarines were five United States Navy submarines built by the Fore River Shipbuilding Company in Quincy, Massachusetts, under a subcontract from  the Electric Boat Company. Built between 1906 and 1909, and in commission from 1908 to 1919, all five were subsequently sold for scrap in 1920. They were considerably larger than the preceding B class at 275 tons submerged vs. 173 tons submerged, and were the first United States submarines with two-shaft propulsion, doubling the machinery of the B class.

Design
These vessels included some features intended to increase underwater speed that were standard on United States submarines of this era, including a small sail and a rotating cap over the torpedo tube muzzles. For extended surface runs, the small sail was augmented with a temporary piping-and-canvas structure. Apparently, the "crash dive" concept had not yet been developed, as this would take considerable time to deploy and dismantle. This configuration remained standard through the L class, commissioned 1916-1917. The streamlined, rotating torpedo tube muzzle cap eliminated the drag that muzzle holes would otherwise cause. In the stowed position, the submarine appears to have no torpedo tubes, as the holes in the cap are covered by the bow stem.  This feature remained standard through the K class, after which it was replaced with shutters that were standard through the 1950s.

Service history
The C-class submarines served in the Atlantic Fleet. On 20 May 1913, the five C-class boats of the First Group, Submarine Flotilla, Atlantic Fleet, departed Norfolk, Virginia  for Guantanamo Bay, Cuba. They exercised in Cuban waters, principally conducting torpedo exercises, until 7 December 1913. On that date the C-class boats, now of the redesignated First Division, escorted by four surface ships, sailed for Cristóbal in the Panama Canal Zone. Five days later the ships completed the  passage, at that time the longest cruise made by United States submarines under their own power. The submarines remained at the Coco Solo submarine base until they were decommissioned in 1919 and scrapped in 1920.

Ships
  was laid down on 3 August 1905, launched on 4 October 1906 as Octopus and commissioned on 30 June 1908. Renamed C-1 on 17 November 1911, the submarine was decommissioned on 4 August 1919, and sold for scrap on 13 April 1920.
  was laid down on 4 March 1908, launched on 8 April 1909 as Stingray and commissioned on 23 November 1909. Renamed C-2 on 17 November 1911, the submarine was  decommissioned on 23 December 1919, and sold for scrap on 13 April 1920.
  was laid down on 17 March 1908, launched on 8 April 1909 as Tarpon and commissioned on 23 November 1909. Renamed C-3 on 17 November 1911, the submarine was decommissioned on 23 December 1919, and sold for scrap on 12 April 1920.
  was laid down on 17 March 1908, launched on 17 June 1909 as Bonita and commissioned on 23 November 1909. Renamed C-4 on 17 November 1911, the submarine was  decommissioned on 15 August 1919, and sold for scrap on 13 April 1920.
  was laid down on 17 March 1908, launched on 16 June 1908 as Snapper and commissioned on 2 February 1910. Renamed C-5 on 17 November 1911, the submarine was  decommissioned on 23 December 1919, and sold for scrap on 13 April 1920.

See also
U-5-class submarine (Austria-Hungary) — three built to same design

References

Citations

Sources
 Friedman, Norman US Submarines through 1945: An Illustrated Design History, Naval Institute Press, Annapolis:1995, .
 Gardiner, Robert, Conway's All the World's Fighting Ships 1906–1921, Conway Maritime Press, 1985. .
 Silverstone, Paul H., U.S. Warships of World War I (Ian Allan, 1970), .
Navsource.org early submarines page
Pigboats.com C-boats page

External links

 pigboats.com — The C-boats (images and crew lists)

Submarine classes
 
 C class